This is a list of national, regional and local television and radio stations owned by the Raidió Teilifís Éireann in Ireland.

List of television stations

National
RTÉ One - Flagship channel showing news, current affairs, factual, drama, entertainment, and movies.
RTÉ One HD
RTÉ One +1
RTÉ2 - A range of programming including movies and sport.
RTÉ2 HD
RTÉ2 +1
RTÉjr - Focuses on children's programming.
RTÉjr HD
RTÉ News - Rolling news and current affairs.
RTÉ News HD

Proposed
 RTÉ Ireland
 RTÉ Three

List of national radio stations

FM
RTÉ Radio 1 - Speech and music
RTÉ 2FM - Contemporary hit radio
RTÉ Raidió na Gaeltachta - Irish-language speech and music
RTÉ Lyric FM - Classical / specialist music

AM, DAB and online platforms only
RTÉ 2XM - Alternative music
RTÉ Junior - Children's (daytime 7.00–21.00)
RTÉ Chill - Relaxation (overnight 21.00–7.00)
RTÉ Gold - Nostalgia and oldies
RTÉ Pulse - Electronic music
RTÉ Radio 1 Extra - Intelligent speech

List of former stations

Television
 Tara Television

Radio
 Atlantic 252
 Millennium 88FM
 RTÉ Digital Radio News
 RTÉ Digital Radio Sport
 RTÉ Choice

Raidió Teilifís Éireann